Jubu may refer to:

Jewish Buddhist
Jubu, Nepal